Elina Tzengko (born 2 September 2002) is a Greek javelin thrower. She won the gold medal at the 2022 European Athletics Championships, becoming the youngest ever javelin and Greek European champion. Tzengko took a silver and a gold at the 2021 World and European Under-20 Championships respectively. She is considered as one of the talents of Greek classical sport.

Early life
Elina Tzengko was born in Greece and grew up in Nea Kallikrateia, Chalkidiki. She has two sisters of whom is the youngest. Both of her parents are Albanian immigrants. Tzengko received Greek citizenship on 22 June 2018. When she was at primary school, she joined the sports club of A.S. Kentavros Neas Kallikrateias (Αθλητικός Σύλλογος - Α.Σ. Κένταυρος Νέας Καλλικράτειας). In 2021, she started studying at the School of Physical Education and Sports Science of the Aristotle University of Thessaloniki.

Career
In 2018, Tzengko competed in the European Athletics Under-18 Championships in Hungary, where she placed seventh. At the Summer Youth Olympics held in Buenos Aires, Argentina in October, she won the gold medal with throws of 63.34 m and 61.74 m, and was voted European Athletics top female athlete of the month.

The following year in May, she set the world U18 best of 65.90 m (javelin 500 g) at the Panhellenic School Championships in Ioannina.

On 1 August 2020, the 17-year-old threw world U20 record of 63.96 m at the Greek U20 Championships held also in Ioannina. However, World Athletics refused to recognize it as a record because doping control was not conducted immediately following the completion of the competition as required by anti-doping regulations.

In July 2021, she became the European U20 champion. The next month, with a throw of 59.60 m, Tzengko earned the silver medal at the World U20 Championships in Nairobi, Kenya.

On 20 August 2022, still only 19, Tzengko won the gold medal with a personal best of 65.81 metres at the European Championships held in Munich. She became the youngest athlete in her discipline – male or female – to win the title at the Europeans, the first teenager to win a European throwing title, and the youngest ever Greek European champion. In October, Tzengko also became the first Greek athlete in history to receive European Athletics Rising Star award as she was crowned 2022 Female Rising Star.

Achievements

International competitions

National titles
 Greek Athletics Championships: 2020, 2021, 2022

References

External links

 

2002 births
Living people
People from Chalkidiki
21st-century Greek women
Greek female javelin throwers
Greek people of Albanian descent
Naturalized citizens of Greece
European Athletics Championships medalists
Youth Olympic gold medalists for Greece
Athletes (track and field) at the 2018 Summer Youth Olympics
World Athletics Championships athletes for Greece
Greek European Athletics champions (track and field)